Jack Johnson (October 15, 1928 – August 1, 1993) was an American sports shooter. He competed in the skeet event at the 1972 Summer Olympics.

References

1928 births
1993 deaths
American male sport shooters
Olympic shooters of the United States
Shooters at the 1972 Summer Olympics
People from Bradford, Ohio
Sportspeople from Ohio